The 1914–15 Lancashire Cup was the tenth year of this regional rugby league competition and the last until 1918–19 as the competition was suspended for the duration of the First World War. The cup was won by Rochdale Hornets who beat last year's losing finalists Wigan in the final at The Willows, Salford  by a score of 3-2. The attendance at the final was 4,000 and receipts £475.

Background 
The First World War had already broken out before the start of the 1914–15 season commenced.  Despite the war the decision to play both the regular season and the cup competitions was taken and all were played to a conclusion, although the lack of enthusiasm was evident in the lower attendances at matches and with many teams absent many players who had already enlisted in the Army and the Royal Navy.

The number of teams entering this year's competition was again 12 with four byes in the first round

Competition and results

Round 1  
Involved  4 matches (with four byes) and 12 clubs

Round 2 – quarterfinals

Round 3 – semifinals

Final

Teams and scorers 

Scoring - Try = three (3) points - Goal = two (2) points - Drop goal = two (2) points

The road to success

Notes 
 1 The Willows was the home ground of Salford

References

RFL Lancashire Cup
Lancashire Cup